Danny Guijt (born 7 February 1981) is a Dutch former professional footballer who played as a midfielder.

Club career
Guijt made his debut in professional football in the 2000–01 Eerste Divisie season for TOP Oss. After four seasons, playing as a regular for TOP, he decides to play for RBC Roosendaal who play in the Eredivisie. His second season for RBC proves to be a failure, with Guijt only playing three matches because of an injury. RBC were also relegated, meaning that Guijt would play in the second division again. Following a series of good performances from Guijt in the 2006–07 season, various Eredivisie clubs showed their interest in him.

In 2008, he chose to sign with SC Cambuur, another club from the Dutch second division. He signed a contract, keeping him in Leeuwarden until mid-2011. He signed a two-year contract with Willem II in June 2011, who signed him from Cambuur on a free transfer. Between 2013 and 2016, he played for the first team of VV Katwijk before retiring from football. 

Guijt has worked as a paint wholesaler.

References

External links
 Official Danny Guijt profile on Cambuur.nl 
 Voetbal International: Danny Guijt 

1981 births
Living people
Dutch footballers
TOP Oss players
RBC Roosendaal players
SC Cambuur players
Willem II (football club) players
Eredivisie players
Eerste Divisie players
Derde Divisie players
Footballers from Leiden
VV Katwijk players
Association football midfielders